Gong County may refer to:

Gong County, Sichuan, county in Yibin, Sichuan, China
Gong County, Henan, former name of Gongyi, city in Henan, China